Anni Frind (3 February 1900 – 8 April 1987) was one of the most highly recorded lyric sopranos in Germany during the 1920s and 30s.

Anni Frind was born into a German family in Nixdorf, a small town in Bohemia (now Czech Republic).

Career
She made her debut in 1922 at the Volksoper Berlin and went on to sing leading soprano roles in both opera and operetta at the Munich State Opera, the Dresden State Opera, the German Opera House in Berlin and other major European cities. After the successful premiere of Ralph Benatzky's operetta Casanova in 1928, her energies were devoted mainly to operetta; and the ever-popular HMV recording of "The Nuns' Chorus" (comp. Johann Strauss II/arr. Ralph Benatzky) was produced. She appeared as Adele in Max Reinhardt's production of Die Fledermaus 200 times.

Retirement from professional singing and later life
Anni Frind retired from professional singing at the outbreak of World War II, subsequently marrying. At the end of the war she sang for Allied soldiers at the front and worked as a volunteer nurse. Anni Frind-Sperling moved to New Orleans in 1951, and became a singing teacher at Newcomb College Tulane University. She died 1987 in New Orleans aged 87.

References 

1900 births
1987 deaths
German operatic sopranos
Sudeten German people
20th-century German women  opera singers
Musicians from New Orleans
Tulane University faculty
German emigrants to the United States
People from Děčín District
Centaur Records artists